Sidqi (Arabic: صدقي, Sidqī; also spelled Sedki, Sedqi, Sıdkı, or Sıtkı) The dotless i appears in Turkish spellings.

Given name
 Sitki Akçatepe (1902–1985), Turkish actor
 Sıtkı Ferdi İmdat (born 2001), Turkish football player
 Sıtkı Güvenç (1961–2023), Turkish politician
 Sedki Sobhi, Egyptian politician
 Sıtkı Üke (1876– 1941), Turkish military officer and politician
 Sıtkı Yırcalı (1908–1988), Turkish lawyer and politician
 Sıtkı Uğur Ziyal (born 1944), Turkish diplomat

Middle name
 Cahit Sıtkı Tarancı (1910–1956), Turkish poet and author
 Jamil Sidqi al-Zahawi, Iraqi poet and philosopher
 Muhammad Sidqi Mahmud, Egyptian Air Force commanding general

Surname
 Atef Sedki, Egyptian politician
 Aziz Sedki, Egyptian politician
 Bakr Sidqi, Iraqi nationalist and general 
 Hala Sedki, Egyptian actress
 Hamada Sedki, Egyptian football coach
 Isma'il Sidqi, Egyptian politician
 Muhammad Najati Sidqi, Palestinian politician
 Şahap Sıtkı, Turkish writer

Arabic-language surnames
Arabic masculine given names
Turkish masculine given names